The 2022–23 Super League Greece, known as Stoiximan Super League for sponsorship reasons, is the 87th season of the Super League Greece, the top Greek professional league for association football clubs, since its establishment in 1959. Olympiacos are the defending champions. As the 2022 FIFA World Cup was started on 21 November, the last round before stoppage was held on 13 November. The league was resumed games on 21 December.

Teams
Fourteen teams will compete in the league – the top twelve teams from the previous season, one team of play-off winner and one team promoted from the Super League 2. Levadiakos will play in the Super League for the first time since the 2018–19 season. Apollon Smyrnis has been relegated to 2022–23 Super League Greece 2, ending their two-year stay in the top flight.

Stadiums and locations

Personnel, kits and TV channel

Managerial Changes

League table

Results

Positions by round
The table lists the positions of teams after each week of matches. To preserve chronological evolvements, any postponed matches are not included in the round at which they were originally  scheduled, but added to the full round they were played immediately afterwards. For example, if a match is scheduled for round 13, but then postponed and played between rounds 16 and 17, it will be added to the standings for round 16.

Play-off round

The top six teams from Regular season will meet twice (10 matches per team) for places in 2023–24 UEFA Champions League and 2023–24 UEFA Europa Conference League as well as deciding the league champion.

Results

Play-off round positions by round

Play-out round
The bottom eight teams will meet once (seven matches per team) to avoid relegation.The two last placed teams will be relegated at the end of the season.

Results

Play-out round positions by round

Season statistics

Top scorers

Hat-tricks

Top assists

Awards

Best Goal

MVP Month

References

External links
Official website 

Greece
1
A1 Ethniki
A1 Ethniki
2022-23
Greece